Casualty is a British medical drama series that airs weekly on BBC One. It is the longest-running emergency medical drama television series in the world, as well as the most enduring medical drama shown on prime time television in the world. Since its inception in 1986, Casualty has been nominated for a total of over 100 awards, and has won over 30 of these nominations. The following is a full list of these awards and nominations received by Casualty.

British Academy Television Awards
The British Academy Television Awards are presented in an annual award show hosted by the BAFTA. They have been awarded annually since 1955.

Digital Spy Reader Awards

The Digital Spy Reader Awards are an annual digital award ceremony ran by Digital Spy, voted for by readers of the website.

Inside Soap Awards

The Inside Soap Awards are an annual award ceremony that has been run by Inside Soap since 2001.

National Television Awards

The National Television Awards is an annual television awards ceremony broadcast by the ITV network from 1995.

TRIC Awards
The TRIC Awards are an annual award ceremony held the Television and Radio Industries Club.

TV Quick and TV Choice Awards
The TV Quick Awards were an annual award ceremony ran by TV Quick magazine. When the magazine ceased production, the awards were taken over by its sister magazine, TV Choice.

Royal Television Society Awards
The Royal Television Society Awards are a set of annual award ceremonies ran by the Royal Television Society.

Writers' Guild of Great Britain Awards
The Writers' Guild of Great Britain Awards are an annual award ceremony ran by the Writers' Guild of Great Britain.

Other awards and accolades

References

External links
 Awards for Casualty at the Internet Movie Database

Holby
Casualty
Awards and nominations received by Casualty